Stevenage Athletic F.C. was an English football club based in Stevenage, Hertfordshire. The club existed from 1968 until being declared bankrupt in 1976, after which Stevenage Borough were established.

History
The club was established in 1968 after the dissolution of Stevenage Town. The new club joined the Metropolitan League. They finished second in 1969–70 and were promoted to Division One of the Southern League. In 1971 they were placed in Division One North after the league was expanded to three divisions. They applied to join the Eastern Counties League (a lower league) in 1974, but were rejected. The club finished bottom of the division in 1975–76, and resigned from the league on 13 August 1976. After their demise, the club's Broadhall Way ground was subsequently dug up for non-footballing purposes after the council sold the land to a local businessman.

Records
Highest league position: Seventh in Southern League Division One North, 1973–74
Best FA Cup performance: Third qualifying round replay, 1974–75
Best FA Trophy performance: Second qualifying round replay, 1973–74

See also
:Category:Stevenage Athletic F.C. players

References

Defunct football clubs in England
Association football clubs established in 1968
Association football clubs disestablished in 1976
Southern Football League clubs
Defunct football clubs in Hertfordshire
Stevenage
Metropolitan League
1968 establishments in England
1976 disestablishments in England